This page lists biographies of notable people who speak or spoke the Scottish Gaelic language with some degree of fluency, but not necessary as native speakers.

List

 Ali Abbasi
 Alasdair Allan
 Ewen Bain
 John Bannerman, Baron Bannerman of Kildonan
 Meg Bateman (born 1959)
 Brahan Seer
 John Brown (servant)
 Marjorie, Countess of Carrick
 George Buchanan
 Angus Peter Campbell
 Maoilios Caimbeul
 Charles Muir Campbell
 John Francis Campbell
 John Lorne Campbell
 Peter Campbell (Rangers footballer)
 Kyle Carey
 Alexander Carmichael
 Séon Carsuel
 Donald Caskie
 Sìleas na Ceapaich
 Dòmhnall Ruadh Chorùna
 Arthur Cormack
 Iain Crichton Smith
 A. J. Cronin
 Sarah Cruickshank
 Rob Donn
 Joy Dunlop
 Edward Dwelly
 Elizabeth I
 Ruaraidh Erskine
 Adam Ferguson
 Calum Ferguson
 Christiana Fergusson
 Tommy Flanagan (actor)
 Julie Fowlis
 Charles Fraser-Mackintosh
 Gillebríghde Albanach
 Anne Lorne Gillies
 Ewen Gillies
 John Gregorson Campbell
 George Campbell Hay
 Ewen Henderson (musician)
 George Henderson (scholar)
 James IV of Scotland
 Tony Kearney
 Calum Kennedy
 Mary Ann Kennedy (Scottish singer)
 Walter Kennedy (poet)
 Robert Kirk (folklorist)
 Mary Jane Lamond
 Johann Lamont
 David Livingstone 
 Iain Lom
 Simon Fraser of Lovat
 Iain Mac Fhearchair
 Artúr Dall Mac Gurcaigh
 Donald MacAlister
 Kenneth MacAlpin
 Ishbel MacAskill
 Hugh MacColl
 Malcolm MacColl
 Allan MacDonald (poet)
 Calum MacDonald (musician)
 Calum MacDonald (politician)
 Cathy MacDonald
 Flora MacDonald
 Hector MacDonald
 John of Islay, Earl of Ross
 John A. Macdonald
 Kirsteen MacDonald
 Niall Iain MacDonald
 Rory Macdonald (musician)
 Murdo Macfarlane
 Walter Scott MacFarlane
 Tormod MacGill-Eain
 Gregor MacGregor
 Ewen MacLachlan
 Kathleen MacInnes
 Maggie MacInnes
 David Lowe MacIntyre
 Duncan Ban MacIntyre
 Alexander Mackenzie (politician)
 Alexander Mackenzie (explorer)
 Fiona J. Mackenzie
 James Mckenzie (outlaw)
 Neil Mackinnon
 Jessie MacLachlan
 Christian Maclagan
 Alistair MacLean
 Iain MacLean (journalist)
 Sorley MacLean
 Hugh Dan MacLennan
 Calum MacLeod (cricketer)
 Donald MacLeod (pipe major)
 Norman Macleod (journalist)
 Alasdair mac Mhaighstir Alasdair
 Aonghas MacNeacail
 Angus MacNeil
 Flora MacNeil
 Catherine-Ann MacPhee
 MacQueen of Findhorn
 Donnchadh MacRath
 Samuel Liddell MacGregor Mathers
 Hans Matheson
 Karen Matheson
 John Mathieson (surveyor)
 William McBeath
 Andy McCombie 
 Thomas Robert McInnes
 John McKenzie (footballer, born 1925)
 Neil McLennan
 Norman McLeod (minister)
 Margaret McMurray
 Moses McNeil
 Peter McNeil
 Ray Michie, Baroness Michie of Gallanach
 Alexander Montgomerie
 James Graham, 7th Duke of Montrose
 Alasdair Morrison (politician)
 Donnie Munro
 John Munro (poet)
 John Farquhar Munro
 Neil Munro (writer)
 Derek Murray (sports presenter)
 William Neill (poet)
 Iain Noble
 Àdhamh Ó Broin
 Niall O'Gallagher
 James Adolphus Oughton
 John Ross (missionary)
 Michael Russell (politician)
 Thomas Douglas, 5th Earl of Selkirk
 Donald Stewart (Scottish politician)
 John Roy Stewart
 Derick Thomson
 Mary Anne MacLeod Trump
 William J. Watson
 Brian Wilson (Labour politician)

References

People
Gaelic
Gaelic